Álvaro Sanz Catalán (born 14 February 2001) is a Spanish professional footballer who plays as a midfielder for CD Mirandés.

Club career

Barcelona
Born in Caspe, Zaragoza, Aragon, Sanz started his career with CD Caspe before joining Real Zaragoza's youth setup. In 2015, aged 14, he moved to FC Barcelona's La Masia.

On 26 June 2020, after finishing his formation, Sanz signed a new three-year contract with Barça, being promoted to the reserves in Segunda División B. He made his senior debut on 18 October, coming on as a late substitute in a 1–0 home win over Gimnàstic de Tarragona.

Sanz made his first team – and La Liga – debut on 2 January 2022, replacing fellow youth graduate Nico González in a 1–0 away success over RCD Mallorca.

Mirandés
On 20 January 2023, Sanz signed a two-and-a-half-year contract with Segunda División side CD Mirandés.

Career statistics

Club

Honours
Spain U19
UEFA European Under-19 Championship: 2019

References

External links

2001 births
Living people
People from Bajo Aragón-Caspe
Sportspeople from the Province of Zaragoza
Spanish footballers
Footballers from Aragon
Association football midfielders
La Liga players
Primera Federación players
Segunda División B players
FC Barcelona Atlètic players
FC Barcelona players
CD Mirandés footballers
Spain youth international footballers